The Azuca mine is a large silver mine located in the south of Peru in Ayacucho Region. Azuca represents one of the largest silver reserve in Peru and in the world having estimated reserves of 42.7 million oz of silver.

See also 
 Zinc mining
 List of mines in Peru

References 

Silver mines in Peru